The 1974 Northwestern Wildcats team represented Northwestern University in the 1974 Big Ten Conference football season. In their second year under head coach John Pont, the Wildcats compiled a 3–8 record (2–6 against Big Ten Conference opponents) and finished in a three-way tie for seventh place in the Big Ten Conference.

The team's offensive leaders were quarterback Mitch Anderson with 1,282 passing yards, Jim Pooler with 949 rushing yards, and Scott Yelvington with 417 receiving yards. Three Northwestern players received All-Big Ten honors: (1) offensive tackle Paul Hiemenz (AP-1; UPI-2); (2) wide receiver Steve Yelvington (AP-2); and (3) running back Jim Pooler (AP-2).

Schedule

Roster

References

Northwestern
Northwestern Wildcats football seasons
Northwestern Wildcats football